Dongye is a town in southwestern Wutai County, Xinzhou city, Shanxi province, China. , it administers the following two residential communities and 19 villages:
Dongsheng Community
Tuoyang Community
Beijie Village
Xijie Village
Dongjie Village
Nanjie Village
Wujie Village
Huaiyin Village
Beidaxing First Village
Beidaxing Second Village
Beidaxing Third Village
Nandaxing Village
Xihe Village
Yong'an Village
Yongxing Village
Wenxing Village
Shi Village
Qianpu Village
Xinpu Village
Dapu Village
Wangjinggang Village

See also
List of township-level divisions of Shanxi

References

Township-level divisions of Shanxi
Divisions of Wutai County